Maximilian Weiß (born 22 June 1998) is a German footballer who plays as a midfielder for Bayern Hof.

References

External links
 

1998 births
Living people
German footballers
Association football midfielders
FC Carl Zeiss Jena players
ZFC Meuselwitz players
SpVgg Bayern Hof players
3. Liga players
Regionalliga players
Oberliga (football) players
Bayernliga players